The men's 400 metres competition at the 2012 Summer Olympics in London, United Kingdom, was held at the Olympic Stadium on 4–6 August. Forty-nine athletes from 38 nations competed. The event was won by Kirani James of Grenada, earning the country its first Olympic medal. Luguelín Santos's silver was the Dominican Republic's first medal in the men's 400 metres. Lalonde Gordon's bronze was Trinidad and Tobago's first medal in the event since 1964. 

It was only the fourth time that no American was on the podium—following 1908 (where a rules dispute led to disqualification of one of the Americans in the final and the refusal of the other two Americans to run in protest), 1920 (where the top American came in fourth with the same time as the silver and bronze medalists) and 1980 (when the United States boycotted the Games entirely).

It was the first time in any Olympic event that three different Caribbean nations shared the podium.

Summary

The first round went largely to form, but defending champion Lashawn Merritt came to the meet injured and re-injured himself, unable to finish. Renny Quow also failed to start his heat. In the first race, Oscar Pistorius ran a season best to qualify. In the second heat, world champion Kirani James ran easily to win. The third heat featured three national records as Jonathan Borlée took his twin brother's mark for Belgium (Kevin also qualified in the seventh heat), Pavel Maslák set the mark for the Czech Republic and Donald Sanford set the mark for Israel. Most of the time qualifiers came from the hotly contested fourth heat, 45.61, the slowest time qualifier, though Conrad Williams got in with a 46.12 in the slow sixth heat.

It took under 45 seconds to make the final as Lalonde Gordon led the qualifiers from heat 1. Heat 2 featured James and Jonathan Borlée, and double-amputee Pistorius' attempt to make the final. But Pistorius' late charge was non-existent and he finished last in the heat. After the race, in a show of sportsmanship, James and Pistorius exchanged bib numbers, which James proudly showed as he celebrated.  In the third heat, shotgun survivor Bryshon Nellum ran 45.02 for the fastest non-qualifier.

Aside from Chris Brown, the finals were filled by athletes under age 24, three of them still teenagers. Demetrius Pinder took the early lead down the back stretch, but reigning World Junior Champion Luguelin Santos (age 18) and reigning World Champion Kirani James (age 19) were in the lead coming off the turn. Down the stretch, James powered ahead for the gold medal. It was also the first Olympic medal for his country. Lalonde Gordon came from behind but could not overtake Santos; he received a bronze. Santos' silver medal was the third medal for the Dominican Republic, coming 45 minutes after Felix Sánchez won his second gold.

Background

This was the 27th appearance of the event, which is one of 12 athletics events to have been held at every Summer Olympics. Five of the finalists from 2008 returned: gold medalist LaShawn Merritt of the United States, fourth-place finisher Chris Brown of the Bahamas, sixth-place finisher Martyn Rooney of Great Britain, seventh-place finisher Renny Quow of Trinidad and Tobago, and eight-place finisher Johan Wissman of Sweden. 2008 gold and 2012 silver medalist Jeremy Wariner failed to make the U.S. team. Despite the Americans' string of 7 straight victories, it was the young Kirani James of Grenada who was favored going into this event. Merritt was the strongest American, but James had beaten him at the 2011 world championships and Merritt came into the 2012 Games injured.

Brunei, Kazakhstan, Latvia, Macedonia, Myanmar, and Palestine appeared in this event for the first time. There was one Independent Olympic Athlete from the former Netherlands Antilles, which had previously competed in 1976. The United States made its 26th appearance, most of any nation, having missed only the boycotted 1980 Games.

Qualification

A National Olympic Committee (NOC) could enter up to 3 qualified athletes in the men's 100 metres event if all athletes met the A standard, or 1 athlete if they met the B standard. The qualifying time standards could be obtained in various meets during the qualifying period that had the approval of the IAAF. Indoor and outdoor meets were eligible. The A standard for the 2012 men's 400 metres was 45.30 seconds; the B standard was 45.90 seconds. The qualifying period for was from 1 May 2011 to 8 July 2012. NOCs could also have an athlete enter the 400 metres through a universality place. NOCs could enter one male athlete in an athletics event, regardless of time, if they had no male athletes meeting the qualifying A or B standards in any men's athletic event.

Competition format

The men's 400 metres competition consisted of 7 heats (Round 1), 3 semifinals and a final. The fastest competitors from each race in the heats qualified for the semifinals along with the fastest overall competitors not already qualified that were required to fill the 24 available spaces in the semifinals. A total of eight competitors qualified for the final from the semifinals.

Records
, the existing World and Olympic records were as follows.

No new world or Olympic records were set during the event.

The following new national records were set during the competition.

Schedule

All times are British Summer Time (UTC+1)

Results

Round 1

Qual. rule: first 3 of each heat (Q) plus the 3 fastest times qualified.

Heat 1

[a] Ahmed Mohamed Al-Merjabi was forced to scratch from this race after he injured his foot in a training session three days earlier.

Heat 2

Heat 3

Heat 4

Heat 5

Heat 6

Heat 7

Semifinals

Qual. rule: first 2 of each heat (Q) plus the 2 fastest times (q) qualified.

Semifinal 1

Semifinal 2

Semifinal 3

Final

References

Athletics at the 2012 Summer Olympics
400 metres at the Olympics
Men's events at the 2012 Summer Olympics